Fauna of Moldova may refer to:
 List of birds of Moldova
 List of mammals of Moldova

See also
 Outline of Moldova